Graeme Morton may refer to:

 Graeme Morton (historian), Scottish historian
 Graeme Morton (musician), Australian composer and conductor